This is a list of Maldivian films released in 1995.

Releases

Feature film

See also
 Lists of Maldivian films

References 

Maldivian
1995